Keyhole, commonly known as Maoyan Kanren, which is directly translated as Looking at Human Beings from a Cat's Eye, was a Chinese renowned current affairs and politics forum established in Haikou in April 2000, and was closed on March 30, 2021.

History
Keyhole was registered in Haikou City, Hainan Province, People's Republic of China. The forum was launched in April 2000.

Keyhole was the host block of the Kaidi Club, and was once ranked as the first most visited BBS forum in China. On Mar 30, 2021, it was abruptly shut down.

References 

Defunct websites
Internet censorship
Internet properties established in 2000
Internet properties disestablished in 2021